The 2019 Football Championship of Luhansk Oblast was won by Skif Shulhynka.

The competition consisted of two stages. After the first stage consisting of a single round-robin, all teams were split depending on the points earned with the best 8 qualifying for the First League and the rest 5 for the Second League. During the second stage the 8 First League teams played off for championship title another single round robin, while the 5 Second League teams played off for final ranking also their round-robin tournament.

League table

 Stanychnyk, Bilovodsk, Milove had one point deducted from them.

References

Football
Luhansk
Luhansk